Xorn is the alias of two fictional characters appearing in American comic books published by Marvel Comics. He first appeared in New X-Men Annual 2001, he was created by Grant Morrison and Frank Quitely. He is a mutant who has a miniature star residing in his head, that gives him the abilities of gravitational electromagnetism, self-sustenance, and healing. He is most commonly associated with the X-Men and Brotherhood of Mutants. Initially in the pages of New X-Men, he was revealed to be Magneto in disguise.  However, Excalibur established him as a separate character.

Publication history
Xorn first appeared in New X-Men Annual 2001, Xorn was created by Grant Morrison and Frank Quitely. Originally depicted as a Chinese mutant with a "star for a brain," he is eventually revealed to be the X-Men's nemesis Magneto in disguise at the climax of Morrison's run. After Magneto is apparently killed in the "Planet X" story arc, he appears alive and well a few months later in 2004's Excalibur (vol. 3) #1, which established that Xorn never was Magneto. Marvel has presented several partial explanations, both in the comics pages and in the press as to the true nature, identity, and motives of Xorn.

Fictional character biography

New X-Men
Xorn debuts in New X-Men Annual 2001 imprisoned by the Chinese government, where a corrupt mutant official offers to sell him to John Sublime. Xorn is forced to wear a skull-like mask designed to restrain his energy output as he has a "sun" for a brain in his head. The X-Men and Sublime's U-Men find Xorn just as he is attempting to commit suicide by removing his mask, which would destroy the Earth. Cyclops (with the help of Emma Frost) is able to establish contact with Xorn, convincing him not to kill himself, and offers him a position among the X-Men. Xorn is next seen in New X-Men #122, where Cyclops tracks him down to a monastery, where he is told by the monks that Xorn has demonstrated healing powers. The pair are captured by the Shi'ar but arrive at the X-Mansion in time for Xorn to heal the X-Men of a nano-Sentinel infection, restoring Professor Xavier's ability to walk in the process.

Despite the ordeals through which he had passed, Xorn is optimistic, open, and even somewhat naive. Xorn keeps a diary to share his thoughts with Professor Xavier, since Xavier is "blinded by the sun beneath [his] mask" and cannot read his mind. Here he details his interactions with Chinese immigrants and the residents of Mutant Town in New York City, in particular an incident where he failed to save a young mutant from being killed by frightened policemen. Xorn is soon put in charge of the "Special Class", a group of physical and social misfits attending the Xavier Institute. Though he hopes to befriend these students, he becomes disillusioned as they mock and insult him. He remains determined to help his Special Class, even saving their lives from a group of U-Men.

In the storyline "Planet X", Xorn removes his mask, revealing himself to be the X-Men's nemesis Magneto, who has been believed dead since the destruction of Genosha. Magneto explains that the Xorn identity was an elaborate ruse crafted with the help of Chinese supporters. Having returned Xavier to a crippled state (Xavier had not been healed; Magneto merely used the nano-Sentinels to "glue" his spine together), Magneto levels the X-Mansion and conquers New York City, where he enslaves the human population and destroys much of the city. He attempts to recreate the Brotherhood with Toad, the rebellious Stepford Cuckoo Esme, and the members of Xorn's Special Class.

Magneto finds, however, that many of his recruits are unresponsive to his ideas and approach, with some asking for the return of the more humane Xorn, and others doubtful that Magneto has truly returned, much to his chagrin. Indecisive and relying heavily on the drug Kick to augment his power, he struggles to maintain the loyalty and respect of his followers. He announces a plan to invert the planet by reversing its magnetic poles, and employs increasingly fascistic methods (including the construction of a Nazi-esque crematorium in which he plans to eradicate the remaining human population of the city). He also appears to be experiencing a form of Dissociative identity disorder, as the "Xorn" persona begins to manifest itself as a voice within Magneto's head, claiming to be the embodiment of Magneto's wisdom, idealism, and nobility. After his defeat at the hands of the X-Men, but before his capture, he fatally wounds Jean Grey; Wolverine, in a berserk fury over Grey's death, kills him.

The return of Magneto and the second Xorn
Grant Morrison intended Xorn to be Magneto from his first appearance. As Morrison stated in an interview after they left New X-Men, "In my opinion, there really should not have been an actual Xorn - he had to be fake, that was the cruel point of him". In fact, soon after the revelation of Xorn's identity in New X-Men #146, readers pointed out that clues that Xorn was actually Magneto had been hidden throughout Morrison's run. According to then-X-Men writer Chuck Austen, the X-Men editors liked the Xorn character and hoped Morrison would change their mind about the revelation; when they did not, they asked Austen to bring Xorn back as a separate character. Morrison has expressed criticism of this subsequent retcon in interviews. Marvel also wanted to continue using Magneto; Austen stated that "Marvel saw value in Magneto not being a mass-murderer of New Yorkers."

Marvel retconned the Xorn/Magneto revelation and brought back Xorn and Magneto after Morrison's departure. In Uncanny X-Men #442 and 443, Xavier takes the body of Magneto to Genosha where they hold a funeral for the deceased mutant leader. However, in the last page of Excalibur (vol. 3) #1, Xavier meets Magneto alive and well on Genosha. In subsequent issues of Excalibur, Xavier and Magneto debate the true identity and motives of Xorn, the individual whose bandage-wrapped body they brought to Genosha. In the same month Magneto returned in Chris Claremont's new Excalibur book, Austen's X-Men (vol. 2) #157 introduced a new Xorn named Shen Xorn. Shen Xorn claims to be the twin brother of the original Xorn (now referred to as Kuan-Yin Xorn) who, under the influence of the entity known as Sublime, had pretended to be Magneto. This claim is supported when Emma Frost conducts a thorough mind scan of Shen. Not too long after, Shen Xorn disappears after he unleashes the gravitational forces of his "black hole" for a brain from his head (in direct contrast to his twin brother) in the course of helping the X-Men defeat an attack by a Brotherhood of Mutants led by Exodus.

During the events of the House of M miniseries, millions of mutants find themselves suddenly depowered after Scarlet Witch speaks the phrase "No More Mutants". Among them are Magneto and Shen Xorn.

The true identity of Xorn, and his relationship to the character Magneto, became a subject of confusion for fans. Marvel refrained from giving any complete explanation, eventually hinting the summer 2005 crossover House of M would clear up the situation. The Xorn entry in the Official Handbook of the Marvel Universe: X-Men 2005 stated that "Kuan-Yin eventually revealed himself to be a duplicate of the X-Men's nemesis Magneto, a transformation believed to have been caused by Magneto's daughter, the Scarlet Witch." This explanation was based on a suggestion in House of M #7 wherein Doctor Strange speculates Wanda has been 'playing with the world' for far longer than even she knows, and may have been responsible for her father's puzzling rebirth. An alternative explanation has since been given in the pages of New Avengers since, according to Marvel editor Tom Brevoort, "nobody was satisfied with that offhanded non-explanation, and it didn’t make a heck of a lot of sense by itself even as a throwaway".

The Collective
Later the collective power signatures of the depowered mutants arrives in Alaska and merges with a postal worker named Michael Pointer, he himself unknowingly a mutant. Disoriented and wielding the power of at least fifty mutants, he starts making his way at high speed across Canada, almost immediately and instantly killing S.H.I.E.L.D. forces and every member of Alpha Flight except Sasquatch, and then upon crossing Lake Erie, he goes on a rampage, destroying downtown Cleveland. While Iron Man assists the Sentry in a battle with him that ranges between the orbits of Earth and Mars, Spider-Man and the Vision discover that his body's energy signatures match those previously possessed by the depowered mutants, revealing his powers consist of said depowered mutants' powers. At that point, having determined it to be the best option, S.H.I.E.L.D. has Iron Man let Michael go, and as he learned to fly during the fight, he is able to travel without endangering any more civilians to what is revealed to be his destination, Genosha.

Once there, the collective of energy, now revealed to be sentient and responsible for Michael's actions since he merged with it, transfers itself to and repowers Magneto, who recognizes the intelligence controlling it as Xorn just as the New Avengers arrive. Xorn explains he took the image of Magneto because he knew mutants would follow him, and they needed the real Magneto again. Reference is made to Xorn's confusing history as Vision comments his files on Xorn are incomplete and Wolverine comments, "Xorn's files on Xorn are incomplete", demonstrating of how not even Xorn seems to know who he is. Quake, Iron Man, Ms. Marvel, and the Sentry combine their powers to separate the Collective/Xorn from Magneto and send it into the sun; despite being separated from the Collective, Pointer still has some of its powers, and, as of the end of the Civil War miniseries, is coerced into joining the newly formed Omega Flight, using a suit designed to harness his powers.

Marvel editor-in-chief Joe Quesada in a 2006 Newsarama interview reiterated the Shen Xorn/Kuan-Yin Xorn explanation, but added that "because Xorn's powers were psychokinetic, and his personality was so strong, it basically remained an almost disembodied sentient thing among the big ball of mutant energy. When that energy got sucked down to Earth by Michael and all absorbed by him, Xorn was the dominant personality in the mix, and that's what drove him towards Genosha and Magneto."

All-New, All-Different Marvel
When the Terrigen Mists were released around the globe, whittling down mutantkind's number and suppressing any new mutant manifestation, a militant band composed of Inhumans and Mutants known as the Dark Riders, who long believed in "survival of the fittest", began gunning down all mutant healers, one such mutant is Shen Xorn, who's revealed to have been repowered somehow (it can be assumed that he was repowered by his own twin brother off-panel during the Collective arc) and has now secluded himself somewhere in Tibet. He is able to kill Barrage and make quick work of the rest of the Riders after they chose to battle instead of have tea.

During HYDRA's overthrow of the United States government as seen in the Secret Empire storyline, Shen Xorn is chosen to lead New Tian, a sovereign nation created for mutants somewhere in California. It is later revealed that Emma Frost is the true leader of New Tian and Xorn is the puppet ruler that she controls with her telepathy.

House of X 
Following the consolidation of Mutant peoples on Krakoa during the House of X storyline, Kuan-Yin Xorn was resurrected through Krakoa's Resurrection Protocols, and was seen meditating with his brother Shen in a mountainous region while Magneto demonstrated Krakoa's transportation capabilities to various human diplomats. The Xorn brothers (now calling themselves Xorn and Zorn) remain on Krakoa and occasionally lend their powers to other Mutants' causes - such as David Haller's work as a community healer.

Reception
 In 2014, Entertainment Weekly ranked Xorn 55th in their "Let's rank every X-Man ever" list.

Other versions

Age of Apocalypse
In the 10th anniversary of the Age of Apocalypse which takes place right after the nuclear attack by the Human High Council, Xorn is found by the X-Men in the Breeding Pens following the fall of Apocalypse. In this reality Xorn is female and claimed that her mutant abilities manifested while she and her family were workers in the Seattle Core during the riots that killed the members of Generation Next. Magneto immediately offered her a place with the X-Men.

During her time with the team, Xorn never removed her helmet causing some to believe it contained her energy powers while others in the X-Men whispered that the helmet truly concealed hideous scars from her time in the Core. However the truth was that Xorn was actually the thought deceased Husk who had been manipulated by Mister Sinister and assumed the identity of Xorn and used her husking abilities to enable herself to demonstrate many different powers, in order to infiltrate the X-Men and kill Magneto and Rogue's son, Charles.

Battle of the Atom
A new, female version called Lady Xorn later appears as part of a future team of X-Men that travels back to the present during the Battle of the Atom event. This Xorn is later revealed to be an adult version of the "young" time-displaced Jean Grey, who needed the Xorn mask to control her powers. The team of X-Men she was with was actually the Brotherhood of Mutants from the future, the nemesis of the true X-Men, and she died when her powers went out of control in a battle between the X-Men and the future Brotherhood at Cape Citadel. Xorn later returns alive, and once again battles the X-Men with the rest of the future Brotherhood. However, it is subsequently revealed that this Xorn was just a puppet figure created by Charles Xavier II's mind powers after the real Xorn died during her final confrontation with her younger self. The former Brotherhood are freed from Charles Xavier II's influence and are returned to their timeline.

Ultimate Marvel
The Ultimate Marvel version of Xorn (Kuan-Yi) and his twin brother Zorn (Shen-Yi) first appeared in the miniseries Ultimate Comics: Hawkeye and spread out to be included in other titles like Ultimate Comics: Ultimates and Ultimate Comics: X-Men. The Twins become the leaders of "The People", a genetically-altered species of superhumans that were produced by the Southeast Asian Republic/SEAR as super-soldiers, but later rebelled. The People are in possession of a Super-Soldier Serum that Hawkeye is tasked by SHIELD with retrieving. This led to Shen forming the Eternals, while Kuan formed the Celestials. Hawkeye later leads Nick Fury, the Falcon, and Black Widow to the twin capital cities of SEAR in order to meet with Xorn and Zorn. The two brothers agree to help Fury fight off the Maker's invasion.

Earth-71202
On an alternate Earth, Xorn and his brother Zorn were members of the X-Men. They were killed by Terrax during the Cabal's attack on Earth-71202.

Powers of X 
In one of the timelines experienced by Moira MacTaggert during the Powers of X storyline, Kuan-Yin Xorn becomes one of the final Horsemen of Apocalypse, representing Death. In this timeline he has become a dour nihilist whose powers have been reversed, sucking away life from creatures rather than restoring it, and his helmet is now a mostly-open mask from which blue flame spouts. This version of Kuan-Yin Xorn is responsible for ending his home timeline when the hybrid mutant Rasputin removes his mask, exposing the singularity at the centre of his brain. This final act is done at Xorn's urging: "this is the ending I have always wanted."

In other media

Video games
 In X-Men Legends, the "Mask of Xorn" is the final item a player can get playing the story mode and gives a character the capacity of performing mutant attacks without spending mutant energy.
 In the Marvel: Ultimate Alliance Heroes and Villains expansion pack, Xorn is the third unlockable costume for Magneto.
 In Marvel Heroes, the "Mask of Xorn" is a Unique item wearable by any hero. It has a chance to be dropped by Magneto when defeated.

References

External links
 Xorn on the Marvel Universe
 
 
 
 AlphaFlight.net - Alphanex entry on The Collective

Comics characters introduced in 2001
Characters created by Frank Quitely
Characters created by Grant Morrison
Chinese superheroes
Fictional characters with healing abilities
Fictional mass murderers
Twin characters in comics
Marvel Comics characters who can teleport
Marvel Comics male supervillains
Marvel Comics male superheroes
Marvel Comics mutants
Marvel Comics telepaths